Reginald Lester Harrell Jr. (born November 28, 1981) is a former American football wide receiver in the National Football League.  He most recently played for the Chicago Bears, but was waived on August 27, 2006.  He was originally signed as an undrafted free agent by the New York Jets out of Texas Christian University.

References

1981 births
Living people
Sportspeople from Arlington, Texas
American football wide receivers
TCU Horned Frogs football players
New York Jets players
Dallas Cowboys players
Chicago Bears players